Duncan may refer to:

People 
 Duncan (given name), various people
 Duncan (surname), various people
 Clan Duncan
 Justice Duncan (disambiguation)

Places 
 Duncan Creek (disambiguation)
 Duncan River (disambiguation)
 Duncan Lake (disambiguation), including Lake Duncan

Australia
Duncan, South Australia, a locality in the Kangaroo Island Council
Hundred of Duncan, a cadastral unit on Kangaroo Island in South Australia

Bahamas
Duncan Town, Ragged Island, Bahamas
 Duncan Town Airport

Canada
 Duncan, British Columbia, on Vancouver Island
 Duncan Dam, British Columbia
 Duncan City, Central Kootenay, British Columbia; see List of ghost towns in British Columbia
 Mount Duncan, in the Selkirk Mountains

United States
 Duncan Township (disambiguation)

 Duncan, Arizona
 Duncan, Indiana
 Duncan, Iowa
 Duncan, Kentucky (disambiguation)
 Duncan City, Cheboygan, Michigan
 Duncan, Mississippi
 Duncan, Missouri
 Duncan, Nebraska
 Duncan, North Carolina
 Duncan, Oklahoma
 Duncan, South Carolina
 Fort Duncan, Eagle Pass, Texas

Brands and enterprises
 Duncan (mango), a named mango variety selected and patented in Florida
 Duncan Toys Company, manufacturer of yo-yos and other toys
 Seymour Duncan, a manufacturer of guitar pickups and effects pedals

Music 
 "Duncan" (Paul Simon song)
 "Duncan" (Slim Dusty song)
 "Duncan", a song by Sarah Slean on the album Night Bugs

Ships 
 HMS Duncan (multiple)
 USS Duncan (multiple)

Other uses
Duncan (horse)

See also

 Duncanville (disambiguation)
 
 Dunkin (disambiguation)